The Anubis Tapestry: Between Twilights is a 2006 fantasy novel written and illustrated by Bruce Zick.

Plot summary
Chance Henry's archaeologist father accidentally awakens an evil mummy who steals his soul. Chance risks becoming a mummy himself to rescue his father from the Egyptian Underworld.

Cancelled film adaptation
In 2008, Blue Sky Studios acquired the film rights for an animated film titled Anubis. David H. Steinberg wrote the first draft for the film. The film was originally scheduled for release on July 15, 2016, by 20th Century Fox, but was delayed to March 23, 2018, but, by June 2017, it had been removed from its schedule for unknown reasons. In February 2021, Disney (which bought Fox in 2019) announced that Blue Sky would shut down in April, and cancelled Anubis.

References 

2006 American novels
2006 fantasy novels
Children's fantasy novels
American children's novels
Fiction about mummies
American fantasy novels adapted into films
Egyptian mythology in popular culture
2006 children's books
Cancelled films